Andre Loader is a South African rugby league footballer for the Brakpan Bears. He is a South African international, and has played in the 2013 Rugby League World Cup qualifying against Jamaica and the USA.

References

Loader
Loader
Loader
Brakpan Bears players
Rugby league hookers